Dajana Karajica (born 20 April 1959) is a Bosnian luger. She competed for Yugoslavia in the women's singles event at the 1984 Winter Olympics.

References

External links
 

1959 births
Living people
Bosnia and Herzegovina female lugers
Olympic lugers of Yugoslavia
Lugers at the 1984 Winter Olympics
Sportspeople from Sarajevo